USS Pokagon has been the name of more than one United States Navy ship, and may refer to:

, later YTB-274, a harbor tug in service from 1943 to 1946
, later YTM-746, a harbor tug in Navy service from 1952 to 1964
, a harbor tug in service since 1975

United States Navy ship names